Clypeomorus admirabilis is a species of sea snail, a marine gastropod mollusk in the family Cerithiidae.

Description
The size of the shell varies between 20 mm and 26 mm.

Distribution
This marine species is endemic to Australia and occurs off the Northern Territory and Western Australia.

References

 Houbrick R.S. 1985. Genus Clypeomorus Jousseaume (Cerithiidae: Prosobranchia). Smithsonian Contributions to Zoology 403: 1–131
 Wilson, B. 1993. Australian Marine Shells. Prosobranch Gastropods. Kallaroo, Western Australia : Odyssey Publishing Vol. 1 408 pp.

External links
 

Clypeomorus
Gastropods of Australia
Gastropods described in 1985